Porthcawl railway station served the seaside resort of Porthcawl in South Wales. It closed in 1963.

History
Rail activity began in Porthcawl in 1825, when the Duffryn Llynfi & Porthcawl Railway (actually a tramway) began construction, opening in 1828. Built to a gauge of four feet and seven inches and using rails based on stone sleepers, it was intended for it to serve a projected new port for the transfer of minerals from South Wales. It ran from Duffryn Llynfi near Maesteg via Tondu and Pyle. It was extended to Bridgend in 1834. The South Wales Railway, which passed through both Bridgend and Pyle, opened in 1850. The Llynfi Valley Railway took over the original company in 1847, and upgraded both the former tramway branches, reopening them as broad gauge railways on 10 August 1861. Porthcawl station opened 1 August 1865. The Llynfi Valley Railway merged with the Ogmore Valley Railway in 1866, creating the Llynfi & Ogmore Railway.  Despite the conversion to a railway, trains on the Porthcawl branch continued to be drawn by horses until 1868, when the system was altered again, this time to standard gauge. The new Llynfi & Ogmore Railway was taken over by the Great Western Railway in 1873.

By the early 20th Century, Porthcawl grew in importance as a destination for holiday traffic, and in 1916, the GWR rebuilt the station on a new site. Despite the fact that it had been built a mile nearer to the seafront, the new station was not universally popular; the building was a rather insubstantial structure built of wood and asbestos, and whilst the original station had possessed a footbridge, the GWR did not supply one for the new station, despite the rise from two to three platforms. Passengers using the remoter platforms were obliged to make a long detour via a link at the end of the platforms. A special gate was provided at the end of the departure platform for the use of day-trippers. The original station's turntable was not replaced, but remained derelict on-site for many years. In the decades following the opening of the new station, passenger numbers remained high, with around 70,000 passengers using the station.

The closure came in 1963 despite the fact that the branch was still well-used, and the move was very unpopular with local businesses and residents alike. Poor ticket sales from Porthcawl station itself were used to justify the closure, but the fact that most travelers bought their tickets to, rather than from Porthcawl (the ticket sale therefore recorded elsewhere) was ignored. The trackbed is occupied by a road. The station building is used by the Porthcawl branch of the Sea Cadets.

Notes

Railway stations in Great Britain opened in 1865
Railway stations in Great Britain closed in 1963
Former Great Western Railway stations
Disused railway stations in Bridgend County Borough
1963 disestablishments in Wales